Formula SCCA or Formula Enterprises is a class of open wheel race car sanctioned by the Sports Car Club of America. A spec racing class, all chassis are produced by SCCA Enterprises in association with Van Diemen and include a sealed Mazda MZR powerplant. The chassis can also be fitted with closed-wheel bodywork and converted into a sportscar to race in C Sports Racer or the L3 class of IMSA Prototype Lites. For the 2012 season, the car was also accepted into the U.S. F2000 National Championship's National Class. According to the manufacturer's website, as of March 2010, 120 of the cars have been sold.

SCCA Enterprises also produces the Spec Racer Ford chassis.

History

The SCCA Enterprises introduced the formula and sports racer in 2002. The formula car was allowed in the Formula Atlantic club racing class. In 2003 SCCA Pro Racing created Sports Racing Pro Series for the formula (FS) and sports racer (SRP) cars. For the 2004 racing season the class was merged with the U.S. F2000 National Championship. Elivan Goulart won the Formula SCCA championship and Neil Tilbor won the SCCA Sportscar Championship. Due to the lack of entries for the 2005 season the series was canceled.

The sports racer was allowed in the IMSA Lites L3 class for the 2007 season. The first season was a reasonable success with 8 drivers competing of which 4 raced the full season. Richard Spicer won the championship with 7 wins out of 12 races. 2008 and 2009 saw a significant downfall in drivers with resp. 2 and 3 drivers competing. Therefore, the IMSA decided to drop the L3 class for 2010.

In 2010 SCCA Pro Racing launched the SCCA Pro Formula Enterprises together with the SCCA Pro Spec Racer class. The Formula Enterprises class raced with moderate success. At the end of the 2011 season it was announced that it would merge with the U.S. F2000 National Championship National Class. The national class also allowed Formula Continental cars. Sixteen-year-old Norwegian driver Henrik Furuseth took the championship for Cape Motorsports. For 2013 the National class only allowed Formula Enterprises cars. However, National class saw poor car counts and the class was discontinued for 2014, again leaving no professional series using the formula. 

In 2018 an updated Mazda 2.0L engine and Sadev 6-speed sequential gearbox were introduced to replace the aging 2.3L and 5-speed Elite. The new Formula Enterprises 2 (FE2) spec ran alongside original FE cars in national competition, with champions in each class crowned at the club’s yearly National Championship Runoffs in 2018 and 2019. In 2020, only the new FE2 spec was legal for SCCA National competition relegating original FE spec cars to regional-only competition.

Specifications

Notable champions

The Formula SCCA is raced in various SCCA national and regional events in the Formula Enterprises and C Sports Racer class. Below is an overview of the most important races and championships.

References

External links
Product page at SCCA Enterprises

One-make series
Sports Car Club of America